Rein Karemäe (born 20 August 1934 in Tallinn) is an Estonian politician. He was a member of VIII Riigikogu.

References

Living people
1934 births
Members of the Riigikogu, 1995–1999
Politicians from Tallinn